Ernophthora lechriogramma is a species of snout moth in the genus Ernophthora. It was described by Clarke in 1986. It is found on the Marquesas Archipelago.

References

Moths described in 1986
Cabniini